Ayora is a municipality in the comarca of Valle de Ayora in the Valencian Community, Spain. It lies in the inland part of the Valencian Community on the border of the provinces of Albacete and Alicante.

The Valley of Ayora runs between the mountain ranges of Sierra Palomera and Mugrón to the west, and Cortes de Pallás and the Caroig Peak. Its landscape consists of numerous forest tracks crossing the valleys and bordering the mountains. It contains a number of tourist attractions: the Cave of Don Juan, the Ayora Castle, the Parish church of Our Lady of the Ascension, Hermitages, the Iberian town of the Castellar of Meca, Cave paintings (Cave La Vieja), La Hunde and the rivers Cabriel and Júcar. The region contains a rich variety of fauna and flora and resembles a typical landscape of inland Mediterranean zones.

Gastronomy
The gastronomy of Ayora include Gazpacho Ayorino, a local variety of gazpacho and local paellas which consist of a combination of a variety of seafood and animal meat such as chicken or rabbit.

Notable people
 Evaristo Crespo Azorín (1863-1941) was a Spanish lawyer, politician and professor

References

Municipalities in the Province of Valencia
Valle de Cofrentes